Sevenia pechueli, the spotted lilac tree nymph, is a butterfly in the family Nymphalidae. The butterfly is found in Nigeria, Cameroon, the Republic of the Congo, Angola, the Democratic Republic of the Congo, the Central African Republic, Tanzania, Malawi, Zambia and Namibia. The habitat consists of woodland, especially in marshy areas.

Adults are attracted to fermenting fruit, sucking trees and excrement.

The larvae feed on Maprouna africana, Sapium ellipticum and Hymenocardia species.

Subspecies
Sevenia pechueli pechueli (southern and western Democratic Republic of the Congo, Angola, Namibia)
Sevenia pechueli rhodesiana (Rothschild, 1918) (western and southern Tanzania, Malawi, northern Zambia)
Sevenia pechueli sangbae (Hecq & Peeters, 1992) (northern Nigeria, northern Cameroon, Congo, Central African Republic)

References

Butterflies described in 1879
pechueli
Butterflies of Africa
Taxa named by Hermann Dewitz